Diane Madden (born 1958) is a modern dancer, teacher and choreographer based in Brussels, Belgium and New York City.

Education
Madden attended Hampshire College in Amherst, Massachusetts.

Career
Beginning in 1980, she worked with the Trisha Brown Company. She was rehearsal director from 1984 to 2000. From 1982 to 1987, Madden was part of Channel Z, an improvisational performance ensemble. Other members of Channel Z were Daniel Lepkoff, Robin Feld, Randy Warschaw, Paul Langland, Nina Martin, and Stephen Petronio.

Madden has won several awards, including two from the Princess Grace Foundation and a Bessie Award.

Personal life
Madden married James Dawson in 1997.

References

1959 births
Living people
American female dancers
Dancers from New York (state)
American choreographers
Princess Grace Awards winners